James Steven Bregman (born November 17, 1941, in Arlington, Virginia) was a member of the first American team to compete in judo in the Summer Olympics. He is an Olympic bronze medalist, a world championships bronze medalist, a Pan American Games gold medalist, and a Maccabiah Games gold medalist.

Biography
He is Jewish.  He started Judo at the age of 12 and went to college in Japan.

In 1964 he won the AAU Senior National Judo Championship.

Judo was first in included in the 1964 Summer Olympics in Tokyo, and Bregman won a bronze medal in the under 80 kg category in those games—the only American to bring home a medal in judo in the 1964 Summer Games.

The judo world sometimes speaks with pride of the 1964 US Olympic Judo Team as consisting of an American Jew, an African-American, a Japanese-American, and a Native American (see Nishioka's book in the references, below).

In 1965 he won a gold medal at the Pan American Championships in the 176 pound division.  He also won a gold medal in the 1965 Maccabiah Games in Israel.

Additionally, in 1965, Jim Bregman became the first American to win a medal in the World Championships held in São Paulo, Brazil.  He won another Bronze at that competition.
Bregman has continued to be involved in the American judo community, serving three times as President of the United States Judo Association the organization which helped found in 1968.

In January 2018, Bregman was promoted to the highest judo rank of Judan (10th Degree Black Belt) by the United States Judo Association.

See also
 List of select Jewish judokas
 Ben Nighthorse Campbell (1964 teammate)
 George Harris (1964 teammate)
 Paul Maruyama (1964 teammate)
 Yosh Uchida (Olympic team coach)

References

External links
 Nishioka, Hayward (2000) Judo: Heart and Soul Ohara Publications.  
 An interview with Jim Bregman on the JudoInfo.com web site

1941 births
Living people
People from Arlington County, Virginia
Jewish American sportspeople
American male judoka
Jewish martial artists
Judoka at the 1964 Summer Olympics
Olympic judoka of the United States
Olympic bronze medalists for the United States in judo
Maccabiah Games gold medalists for the United States
Competitors at the 1965 Maccabiah Games
Medalists at the 1948 Summer Olympics
Maccabiah Games medalists in judo
21st-century American Jews